is a Japanese 4-panel manga series by , serialized in Houbunsha's seinen manga magazine Manga Time Kirara Max from the October 2012 issue to February 2022 issue. It has been collected in ten tankōbon volumes as of December 2021. An anime television series adaptation by Silver Link aired in Japan between October and December 2016.

Plot
Joined by programmer Shiina, writer Ayame, and composer Kayo, Tamaki begins working as an illustrator for the club's next game.

Characters

The main protagonist, who becomes the illustrator of the SNS Club. As a fan of hard-boiled shōnen manga, her art-style tends to have a focus on gruff-looking men. She is very fond of her father.

The president of the SNS Club who serves as the programmer. She is often soft-spoken and pessimistic.

The scenario writer of the SNS Club. She has a history of writing adult stories under the pen name "Iris" that she is somewhat embarrassed about.

The composer of the SNS Club. She works part-time as a waitress at a family restaurant.

Tamaki's best friend who is a member of the school's Illustration Club. She is a fujoshi who likes to draw boy's love art.

Former illustrator and previous president of the SNS Club who is currently in college.

A member of the Illustration Club who starts to help out with the SNS Club's games as a second artist. She admires Iris, but is not convinced that Ayame is really her.

Tamaki's classmate and Minaha's older sister.

Ayame's younger brother.

Tamaki's classmate, who is half-caucasian.

Media

Manga

Anime
An anime television series adaptation by Silver Link aired in Japan between October 3, 2016 and December 19, 2016 and was simulcast by Daisuki and Anime Network. The anime was released across four 3 episode Blu-ray & DVD volumes. Sentai Filmworks has licensed the anime in North America.

Episode list

OVA episodes

Video games
The Flash games made by Cloba.U is published on the site. Characters from the series appear alongside other Manga Time Kirara characters in the 2017 mobile RPG, Kirara Fantasia.

Reception
Anime News Network (ANN) had two editors review the first episode of the anime: Theron Martin praised director Shinya Kawatsura and Silver Link for crafting an adaptation that's simplistically charming with characters that carry surprising depth and gorgeous aesthetics. Nick Creamer, while mixed on the animation quality being "mostly just functional," gave credit to the main cast for feeling grounded while still carrying distinct quirks and was optimistic of the series' progression into the daily activities of the game creation club, concluding that its "unlikely to do much for those who aren't already fans of slice of life, but stands as a charming and solidly written example of its genre. It's not a top tier show, but it's a solid effort." Fellow ANN editor Amy McNulty reviewed the complete anime series in 2017 and gave it an overall B grade. Despite the cast not getting equal development, overused jokes and a lack of insight into the club's creation of the games, McNulty commended the chemistry between them and the light-heartedness of both the comedy and animation, calling it "a show that works both as a binge and an occasional watch to cheer you up on days when you just need something light and cheery."

References

External links
 
Anime official website 

Anime series based on manga
Houbunsha manga
Seinen manga
Sentai Filmworks
Silver Link
Yonkoma